Vexillum sinuosum is a species of small sea snail, marine gastropod mollusk in the family Costellariidae, the ribbed miters.

Description
The shell size is 5.2 cm

Distribution
This species is distributed in the seas along Northwest Australia

References

 Turner H. (2008) New species of the family Costellariidae from the Indian and Pacific Oceans (Gastropoda: Neogastropoda: Muricoidea). Archiv für Molluskenkunde 137(1): 105-125. [27 June 2008] page(s): 113

External links
 

sinuosum
Gastropods described in 2008